Phillip Lamarre (born September 18, 1987 in Plantation, Florida) is an American soccer player currently without a club, having last played with the Fort Lauderdale Strikers of the second division North American Soccer League.

Career

Youth and College
Lamarre grew up in Margate, Florida, and attended Marjory Stoneman Douglas High School where he was named to South the Florida Sun-Sentinel and Miami Herald All-Area First Team his senior year, was named Miami Herald Player of the Year, was a two-time champion in both the State Cup and Sun Bowl, and was a member of Florida state team for three years.

He played three years college soccer at Florida Atlantic University, starting in 55 games. At FAU he was named to Atlantic Sun Conference All-Tournament team as a freshman, was named to the Atlantic Soccer Conference All-Conference second team and FAU Classic All-Tournament Team as a sophomore, and moved into first on FAU's career charts for most shutouts, goalkeeper minutes, most saves and most wins in his junior season in 2008, before transferring to Florida International University before his senior year.

Professional
Undrafted out of college, Lamarre signed his first professional contract in 2010 when he was signed by the FC Tampa Bay in the USSF Division 2 Professional League. He was released by the club on February 22, 2011.

On March 30, 2011, Lamarre signed with Fort Lauderdale Strikers of the North American Soccer League. He spent the 2011 season as the third choice goalkeeper. Lamarre left the club at the end of the 2011 season.

Coaching
Since his retirement, Lamarre has returned to his high school alma mater Marjory Stoneman Douglas High School, where he has spent time coaching the boys varsity soccer team.

References

External links
 Florida Atlantic bio

1987 births
Living people
American soccer players
FIU Panthers men's soccer players
Tampa Bay Rowdies players
Miami FC (2006) players
Fort Lauderdale Strikers players
People from Plantation, Florida
People from Margate, Florida
Florida Atlantic Owls men's soccer players
Soccer players from Florida
Association football goalkeepers
Sportspeople from Broward County, Florida
High school soccer coaches in the United States